Lombardo Boyar (born December 1, 1973) is an American actor. He is best known for his recurring role as Chuy in The Bernie Mac Show and for voicing Lars Rodriguez in Rocket Power.

Career
Lombardo is a veteran of the United States Army, having served as a forward observer in the highly decorated 82nd Airborne Division during the 1990s.

Some of Boyar's notable performances include a brief part as convenience-store robber Ramon Garcia on Fox's 24 and a starring role as burglar Eddie Tesoro in P.S. Your Cat Is Dead. He provided voices in both Happy Feet and Coco. and Anglophone cable-TV audiences may also be familiar with Boyar's voice work as Lawrence "Lars" Rodriguez in Klasky-Csupo's Rocket Power cartoons and with his live-action performance as Sergio del Rio on Steven Bochco's Over There. He has also guested on a semi regular basis as Chuy on The Bernie Mac Show. Fluent in English and Spanish with a very adaptable voice, Boyar has also provided voice-over work for commercials.

Boyar had a voice acting role in the 2008 Turok video game as Gonzales.

Filmography

Film

Television

Video games

Source:

References

External links
 

American stand-up comedians
American male comedians
21st-century American comedians
Living people
American male actors of Mexican descent
American male voice actors
American male film actors
American male television actors
American male video game actors
Hispanic and Latino American male actors
1973 births